Kolkata Metro Line 6 or the Orange Line of the Kolkata Metro is an under-construction rapid transit line that will connect New Garia with Netaji Subhas Chandra Bose International Airport via two satellite towns Salt Lake and New Town. The line is targeted to open from Kavi Subhash to Hemanta Mukhopadhyay in 2023. This stretch will be one of the most important stretches of metro because it will connect the southern and the eastern parts of the city with Kolkata Airport. Total distance of this route will be . 

The stretch is expected to be extended till Sector V by October 2023 which will connect it with the Green Line benefiting many office goers.

History 
This project was sanctioned in the budget of 2010–11 by Mamata Banerjee with a project deadline of six years. The execution of this project has been entrusted to RVNL at a cost of Rs 3951.98 crore. It will help to reduce travel time between the southern fringes of Kolkata to Netaji Subhas Chandra Bose International Airport and will have 23 elevated stations, 1 underground station and 1 at-grade. The terminal Airport station being the underground one.

Work for construction of the terminal station at New Garia for the  Kavi Subhash-Biman Bandar (via Rajarhat) metro project finally resumed on 14 February 2017 with Rail Vikas Nigam Ltd (RVNL) demarcating the plot they require for the purpose.

The work has been delayed for years due to multiple issues. At first AAI objected the station above the ground, stating that this could be a threat for air traffic. Many underground utilities, power sub-station and water treatment plant had to be shifted. Encroachments and Land acquisition problems held up the project for multiple times.

The  stretch from New Garia to Ruby Hospital was expected to start from 2018. On 12 February 2018 Mr Ajay Vijayvargiya, General Manager Metro Railways announced a delay in inauguration of New Garia to Ruby stretch.

Stations 
The stations, as declared of now, will be named after eminent personalities. and will have 23 elevated stations, 1 underground station and 1 at-grade. The terminal Airport station will be the underground one. This station will also have a yard and it will be the largest underground facility of India and city's first. One can interchange to Line 4 at Dum Dum Airport, Line 2 at VIP Road (Haldiram) and Salt Lake Sector V and Line 1 at Kavi Subhash. At Kavi Subhash, Rail Interchange will be also available (Sealdah South Section). 

On 4th January 2021 the state government decided to rename 9 metro stations in New Town area to their more prevailing names rather than using the old ones which were given during the planning phase. The state transport department has informed Housing Infrastructure Development Corporation (HIDCO) of the new names of the proposed nine metro stations between Nazrul Tirtha at the entry of New Town from Salt Lake Sector V till Chinar Park, the last station on the line before it turns right on VIP road towards Kolkata Airport.

See also

Kolkata Metro
List of Kolkata Metro stations
Kolkata Metro rolling stock
Lists of rapid transit systems
Trams in Kolkata
Kolkata Light Rail Transit
Kolkata Monorail
Kolkata Suburban Railway

References

External links

Kolkata Metro lines
Kolkata Metro
750 V DC railway electrification